The House of Zhu ruled the Ming dynasty, or China, from 1368 to 1644; in southern China, the Ming state survived until 1662, albeit in an ever-shrinking territory. The Ming was the last Han-led Chinese imperial dynasty, after which China was conquered by the Manchu-led Qing dynasty (1636–1912). The Han-led Chinese nation-state was restored only after the fall of the Qing dynasty in 1912, when the Republic of China was established.

Its founder was Zhu Yuanzhang, the leader of the rebellion against the Mongol-led Yuan dynasty. He and his descendants lifted China to long-term economic prosperity and political stability. Over time, thanks to the polygamy common among the upper classes of Chinese society, the number of male members of the house increased to one hundred thousand. However, except for the emperors and heirs to the throne, they were excluded from politics for the sake of government stability.

From the late 16th century onwards, economic difficulties and the resulting peasant uprisings brought about a weakening of Ming power, which was used by the Manchus in 1644 to overthrow the dynasty and seize power in China.

After the fall of Ming
After the fall of the Ming dynasty, the Manchu-led Qing dynasty started persecuting the Zhu clan, hence a number of members of the clan have changed their surnames to Zhou, Wang, Gao, Guang, Dong, Zhang, Zhuang, and Yan. Some of them changed their family names back to Zhu after the fall of the Qing dynasty.

See also 
 Han Chinese
 Ming dynasty
 Southern Ming
 List of emperors of the Ming dynasty
 Kingdom of Tungning
 Marquis of Extended Grace

References 

Ming dynasty
Individual Chinese surnames